The First Part Last is a young adult novel by Angela Johnson that deals with the subject of teen pregnancy. It's the second book in the Heaven Trilogy. Johnson writes the story in first person narration from the perspective of Bobby, the 16-year-old father, setting it apart from most books on the subject. The book is divided into four parts and its chapters alternate between "then" and "now."

Bobby and Nia, the child's mother, are urban upper-middle-class African-American teenagers in New York. Although the parents initially intended to give their daughter Feather up for adoption, Bobby raises the little girl on his own and realizes how hard it truly is to be a parent. Bobby becomes tired all the time, and can't always get to school on time. Bobby's mother won't do any of the work, because she feels that doing so will only make Bobby more dependent upon them. Nia, while giving birth to Feather, gets eclampsia, a life-threatening complication, which leaves her in a permanent coma. In the end, Bobby moves to Heaven, Ohio.

Characters
Bobby – Main character and Feather's father
K-Boy – Bobby's friend
J.L. – Bobby's friend
Fred – Bobby's father
Mary – Bobby's mother
Paul – Bobby's brother
Mr. Wilkins – Nia's father
Mrs. Wilkins – Nia's mother
Coco Fernandez – Bobby's neighbor
Nia – Bobby's girl-friend and the mother of Bobby's daughter
Nick – Paul's kid
Nora – Paul's kid
Feather – Bobby's baby/kid

Themes 
Kristi Jemtegaard said that Bobby is "venturing alone into fatherhood like someone exploring an alien planet." The author also said the novel's protagonist deals with "disappointed parents and fierce love for his baby.

Reception 
The First Part Last received mostly positive reviews. The Nell Beram said that "Johnson has a unique storytelling strategy." Another author from Publishers Weekly discussed how Bobby's descriptions of Nia conveys to people what a "loving and trustworthy father he promises to be." However, not all reviews from Publishers Weekly were positive; the author also said, "the only misstep is a chapter from Nia's point of view which takes readers out of Bobby's capable hands."
Kirkus Reviews stated "By narrating from a realistic first-person voice, Johnson manages to convey a story that is always complex, never preachy. The somewhat pat ending doesn't diminish the impact of this short, involving story. It's the tale of one young man and his choices, which many young readers will appreciate and enjoy."

Awards and nominations
Coretta Scott King Award, 2004
Michael L. Printz Award, 2004

References

External links
 Teenreads.com review

2003 American novels
American young adult novels
African-American young adult novels
Michael L. Printz Award-winning works
Novels about teenage pregnancy
Novels set in New York City
Coretta Scott King Award-winning works